Hamisi Yusuf (born 8 August 1982) is a retired Tanzanian football striker.

References

1982 births
Living people
Tanzanian footballers
Tanzania international footballers
Young Africans S.C. players
APR F.C. players
Clube Ferroviário de Nampula players
African Lyon F.C. players
Association football forwards
Tanzanian expatriate footballers
Expatriate footballers in Rwanda
Tanzanian expatriate sportspeople in Rwanda
Expatriate footballers in Mozambique
Tanzanian expatriate sportspeople in Mozambique
Tanzanian Premier League players